Xylopropamine (Perhedrin, Esanin), also known as 3,4-dimethylamphetamine, is a stimulant drug of the phenethylamine and amphetamine classes which was developed and marketed as an appetite suppressant in the 1950s.

Xylopropamine was briefly sold as the sulfate salt, but it was not widely marketed. Other related amphetamine derivatives such as 2,4-dimethylamphetamine were also investigated for the same purpose, however these drugs had negative side effects such as high blood pressure and were not very successful, mainly due to the introduction of alternative drugs like phentermine which had similar efficacy but fewer side effects.

Xylopropamine was also reported as having analgesic and anti-inflammatory effects but its side effect profile resulted in it never being further developed for these applications.

See also 
 Methamphetamine
 Dimethylamphetamine
 3,4-Dimethylmethcathinone
 4-Methylamphetamine
 4-Methylmethamphetamine
 Indanylaminopropane

References 

Substituted amphetamines
Anorectics
Serotonin-norepinephrine-dopamine releasing agents